Jeffrey Gunter (born June 1, 1999) is an American football defensive end for the Cincinnati Bengals of the National Football League (NFL). He played college football at Coastal Carolina and N.C. State.

Early life and high school
Gunter grew up in Durham, North Carolina and attended Riverside High School.

College career
Gunter played in all 12 of Coastal Carolina's games as a freshman. He became a starter going into his sophomore season and was named first-team All-Sun Belt Conference after recording 49 tackles and 14 tackles for loss. Following the end of the season, Gunter left the program and transferred to North Carolina State in order to be closer to home. After sitting out one year due to NCAA transfer rules, he opted to transfer back to Coastal Carolina. In his first season back with the Chanticleers, Gunter was again named first-team All-Sun Belt after finishing the year with 58 tackles, 12.5 tackles for loss, and 6.5 sacks. He was named second-team All-Sun Belt as a redshirt senior.

Professional career

Gunter was drafted by the Cincinnati Bengals in the seventh round (252nd overall) of the 2022 NFL Draft.

References

External links
Cincinnati Bengals bio
Coastal Carolina Chanticleers bio
NC State Wolfpack bio

1999 births
Living people
Players of American football from North Carolina
Sportspeople from Durham, North Carolina
American football linebackers
Coastal Carolina Chanticleers football players
NC State Wolfpack football players
Cincinnati Bengals players